Lahcen Abrami (born 31 December 1969 in Casablanca) is a retired Moroccan footballer. He played for several clubs, including Wydad Casablanca and Gençlerbirliği in Turkey.

Abrami played for the Morocco national football team and was a participant at the 1992 Summer Olympics and at the 1998 FIFA World Cup.

References

External links

1969 births
Living people
1998 FIFA World Cup players
Expatriate footballers in Turkey
Footballers at the 1992 Summer Olympics
Gençlerbirliği S.K. footballers
Süper Lig players
Botola players
Moroccan expatriate footballers
Moroccan footballers
Morocco international footballers
Olympic footballers of Morocco
1992 African Cup of Nations players
1998 African Cup of Nations players
2000 African Cup of Nations players
Wydad AC players
Moroccan expatriate sportspeople in Turkey
Footballers from Casablanca
Association football defenders
Al-Wakrah SC players
Qatar Stars League players
Mediterranean Games bronze medalists for Morocco
Mediterranean Games medalists in football
Competitors at the 1991 Mediterranean Games